Saint Vitus' dance, named after Saint Vitus, may refer to:

Pathologies
 Chorea, a movement disorder, specifically either:
 Sydenham's chorea
 Huntington disease
 Dancing mania, a Medieval European social phenomenon

Music
 El vito, a traditional folk song and dance music from Andalusia
 "St. Vitus Dance", a song by Bauhaus from In the Flat Field, 1980
 "St. Vitus Dance", a song by Black Sabbath from Vol. 4, 1972
 "Saint Vitus Dance", a song by Louis Jordan, 1941
 "The St. Vitus Dance", an instrumental by Horace Silver from Blowin' the Blues Away, 1959